Simone Bolelli and Horacio Zeballos were the defending champions but decided not to participate. Bolelli entered the Estoril Open instead, while Zeballos competes in the Tunis Open.
František Čermák and Filip Polášek won the tournament defeating Xavier Malisse and Dick Norman 6–4, 7–5 in the final.

Seeds

Draw

Draw

References
 Main Draw

BMW Open - Doubles
2012 BMW Open